Mikko Tapio Latvala (born 8 July 1980 in Vaasa) is a Finnish pole vaulter. He won a silver medal for his category at the 2001 European Athletics Under-23 Championships in Amsterdam, Netherlands, with his best possible height of 5.50 metres. In 2007, Latvala suffered from multiple serious injuries, including a torn chest muscle as a result of a weightlifting accident in South Africa.

Latvala qualified for the 2008 Summer Olympics in Beijing, by successfully clearing a B-standard height of 5.63 metres from the Finnish Elite Games series in Lapua. He placed twenty-second in the first round of men's pole vault, with a best possible height of 5.45 metres, tying his overall position with Ukraine's Oleksandr Korchmid.

Latvala is also a full-time member of Haapajärven Kiilat, a local track and field club in Haapajärvi, and is coached and trained by his brother Toni.

References

External links

Profile – Suomen Olympiakomitea 
NBC 2008 Olympics profile

Finnish male pole vaulters
Living people
Olympic athletes of Finland
Athletes (track and field) at the 2008 Summer Olympics
Sportspeople from Vaasa
1980 births